Dharugapuram (Tamil:தாருகாபுரம்) is a panchayat Village in Tenkasi district in the Indian state of Tamil Nadu.  This village is under the control of  Vasudevanallur block Sivagiri taluk

References 

Villages in Tirunelveli district